René Barjavel (24 January 1911 – 24 November 1985) was a French author, journalist and critic who may have been the first to think of the grandfather paradox in time travel. He was born in Nyons, a town in the Drôme department in southeastern France. He is best known as a science fiction author, whose work often involved the fall of civilisation due to technocratic hubris and the madness of war, but who also favoured themes emphasising the durability of love.

René Barjavel wrote several novels with these themes, such as Ravage (translated as Ashes, ashes), Le Grand Secret, La Nuit des temps (translated as The Ice People), and Une rose au paradis. His writing is poetic, dreamy and sometimes philosophical. Some of his works have their roots in an empirical and poetic questioning of the existence of God (notably La Faim du tigre). He was also interested in the environmental heritage which we leave to future generations. Whilst his works are rarely taught in French schools, his books are very popular in France.

Barjavel wrote Le Voyageur imprudent (1943), the first novel to present the famous Grandfather paradox of time travel: if one goes backwards in time and kills one of their ancestors before he had children, the traveller cannot exist and therefore cannot kill the ancestor.

Barjavel died in 1985 and was buried with his ancestors in Tarendol (commune) cemetery, opposite Mount Ventoux in Provence. He used these place names in his books; Mount Ventoux appears as the site of the space base in Colomb de la lune, for example, and Tarendol is the name of the hero in the eponymous novel.

René Barjavel Prize
The Intergalactiques science fiction festival, held annually in Lyon, has awarded the René Barjavel Prize to the best work of science fiction addressing a chosen topic.  The themes of previous prizes are:

 2013: "The Augmented Man".  Winner: Impress Genetic inc. by Élodie Boivin.  Special jury mention to Fermata by Mathieu Rivero.
 2014: “Eco-system(s)”
 2015: "The Reckless Traveler"
 2016: "The Galactic Empire Lies to You"
 2018: "Open letter to living people who want to stay that way"
 2019: "The world suddenly ends, and then the world finally had a reaction...".  Winner: MAZUKU by Atmann Bonnaire
 2020: "There is someone who lives in my head, and he does not live in this century".

Selected filmography
 Women Without Names (1950)
 The Return of Don Camillo (1953)
 The Terror with Women (1956)
 The Case of Doctor Laurent (1957)
 Chair de poule (1963)

Bibliography 
 Colette à la découverte de l'amour (1934)
 Roland, le chevalier plus fort que le lion (1942)
 Ravage (1943) – translated as Ashes, Ashes
 Le Voyageur imprudent (1944) – translated as Future Times Three
 Cinéma total (1944)
 Les enfants de l'ombre (1946)
 Tarendol (1946) – translated as The Tragic Innocents
 Le diable l'emporte (1948)
 Journal d'un homme simple (1951)
 Colomb de la lune (1962)
 La Faim du tigre (1966)
 La Nuit des temps (1968) – translated as The Ice People
 Les Chemins de Katmandou (1969)
 Les Années de la lune (1972)
 Le Grand Secret (1973) – translated as The Immortals
 Les Dames à la licorne (1974)
 Le Prince blessé (1974)
 Brigitte Bardot amie des animaux (1974)
 Les Années de la liberté (1975)
 Les Années de l'homme (1976)
 Si j'étais Dieu ... (1976)
 Les Jours du monde (1977)
 Les Fleurs, l'Amour, la Vie (1978)
 Lettre ouverte aux vivants qui veulent le rester (1978)
 Une rose au paradis (1981)
 La Charrette bleue (1981)
 La Tempête (1982)
 L'Enchanteur (1984)
 La Peau de César (1985)
 Demain le paradis, (1986) (not completed, edited after his death)

See also 
 L'Étrange Désir de monsieur Bard (film, 1954)
 Goubbiah, mon amour (film, 1956)

References

External links
Barjaweb 
Cinéma total 

1911 births
1985 deaths
People from Nyons
French science fiction writers
Prix des libraires winners
Prix Maison de la Presse winners
Writers from Auvergne-Rhône-Alpes
20th-century French novelists
20th-century French male writers
French male novelists